Claudio Fernández-Aráoz is an Argentinian author, international speaker and global expert on talent and leadership, ranked by BusinessWeek as one of the most influential executive search consultants in the world. He is currently a senior adviser of Egon Zehnder. Before joining Egon Zehnder in 1986, he worked at McKinsey & Company in Europe. He is a frequent lecturer at the Harvard Business School. In 2008 he also won the Konex Award as one of the most importants executive of that decade in Argentina.

Background
Fernández-Aráoz earned a Master of Science in Industrial Engineering from the Pontifical Catholic University of Argentina, graduating with a Gold Medal, and an MBA from Stanford University, where he graduated with honors as an Arjay Miller Scholar.

Work
He is the author of It's Not the How or the What but the Who (Harvard Business Press, 2014), Great People Decisions (Wiley, 2007) which was acclaimed by Jim Collins, Daniel Goleman and Jack Welch, and has published several bestselling articles on the topic of People Decisions, including Hiring Without Firing, The Definitive Guide to Recruiting in Good Times and Bad, How to Hang On to Your High Potentials, and the June 2014 cover article 21st Century Talent Spotting of the Harvard Business Review. He has also written for MIT Sloan Management Review.

References

External links
Claudio Fernández-Aráoz at Harvard Business Review
Claudio Fernández-Aráoz at Egon Zehnder
Fernández-Aráoz at World Business Forum
How Raising Beef Calves Reveals the Best Strategy for Hiring Executives post by Fernández-Aráoz at Forbes
Claudio Fernández-Aráoz speaking on Morning Joe at MSNBC
Using Simple Math, An Expert Proves You're Passing on Top Talent at Inc. (magazine)

Sources

Living people
Year of birth missing (living people)
People from Buenos Aires
Pontifical Catholic University of Argentina alumni
Lecturers
Stanford University alumni